is a song recorded by Japanese singer Shizuka Kudo. It was released as a single by Pony Canyon on February 18, 1998. The song served as one of the theme songs to the tanpatsu dramas aired in 1998 on CX's Kinyō Entertainment time slot. "Setsu Getsu Ka" made its first album appearance on the compilation album, Best of Ballade: Current.

Background and composition
"Setsu Getsu Ka" was written by Miyuki Nakajima and arranged by Ichizō Seo. It marks Kudo's second single to be produced by Nakajima and Seo, the first being "Gekijō". The song is composed in the key of B minor and Kudo's vocals span from B3 to A4 in modal voice, and up to C5 in head voice. Lyrically, Nakajima writes about a protagonist's frustrations with a lover unwilling to be vulnerable with her, imploring her subject to "set her free from the loneliness". Kudo was praised for her earnest interpretation of Nakajima's lyrics.

Cover version
Nakajima first covered the song in concert during her Miyuki Nakajima Concert Tour 1998 tour. She later recorded her own version of the song, which was released in 2002 on the album, Otogibanashi: Fairy Ring.

Chart performance
The single debuted at number 23 on the Oricon Singles Chart, selling 21,000 copies in its first week. It fell to number 34 the following week, with sales of 13,000 copies. "Setsu Getsu Ka" stayed in the top 100 for a total of twelve weeks.

Track listing

Charts

References

1998 songs
1998 singles
Songs written by Miyuki Nakajima
Japanese television drama theme songs
Television drama theme songs
Shizuka Kudo songs
Miyuki Nakajima songs
Pony Canyon singles